Arlon-Marche-Bastogne was a parliamentary constituency in Belgium used to elect members of the Walloon Parliament from 1995 until 2019. It corresponds to the arrondissements of Arlon, Marche-en-Famenne and Bastogne.

A January 2018 decree merged both Luxembourg constituencies (Arlon-Marche-Bastogne and Neufchâteau-Virton) into one.

Representatives

References

Constituencies of the Parliament of Wallonia